Line 2 is a north-south line of Suzhou Rail Transit. It passes through five districts of Suzhou, and has 22 stations, 17 underground and 5 elevated. It began operations on December 28, 2013.

History

Opening timeline

Stations

Operations

Intervals

References

Suzhou Rail Transit lines
Railway lines opened in 2013